The Brazil–Venezuela border is the limit that separates the territories of Brazil and Venezuela. It was delimited by the Treaty of Limits and River Navigation of May 5, 1859 and ratified by the Protocol of 1929. The geographical boundary begins at the triple point between Brazil-Colombia-Venezuela at Cucuy Rock and continues up the Maturacá channel to the Huá waterfall; it then follows a straight line to the top of a mountain called Cerro Cupi. It then follows the crest of the drainage divide between the Orinoco and Amazon river basins up to the Brazil-Guyana-Venezuela border tripoint on top of Mount Roraima, thus covering a total of 2,199 kilometres (of which 90 km are conventional boundaries and the other 2,109 km correspond to the watershed between the basins of the Amazon (Brazil) and Orinoco (Venezuela)) through the Imeri, Tapirapecó, Curupira and Urucuzeiro mountain ranges (Brazilian state of Amazonas), and the Parima, Auari, Urutanim and Pacaraima ranges (State of Roraima), in the Guiana Shield.

Because Venezuela claims the western portion of Guyana as Guayana Esequiba, from the Venezuelan point of view the border only ends at the headwaters of the Essequibo River in the Mapuera range, thus covering a total length of 2,850 km. However, the Venezuelan claims to the area are not officially recognized by Brazil, and Guyana exerts effective control over the disputed region.

The internationally recognized border is mostly located in remote and inaccessible wilderness areas, and it has only one road crossing, between the towns of Pacaraima (Brazil) and Santa Elena de Uairén (Venezuela), where the Brazilian BR-174 federal highway from Boa Vista and Manaus joins the Venezuelan Troncal 10 from Ciudad Guayana and Caracas.

Recent developments 
Roraima, Brazil's northernmost state, experienced a large influx of Venezuelan immigrants along its border in 2018. On August 7, the regional government requested that the Supreme Federal Court of Brazil close the border, and later that day the Supreme Federal Court denied the request on constitutional grounds.

On February 22, 2019, amid the Venezuelan presidential crisis, President Nicolás Maduro closed the border to prevent international humanitarian aid from reaching Venezuela by land. In May 2019, the Venezuelan government announced the re-opening of the border.

2020 coronavirus pandemic 

On March 16, 2020, President Jair Bolsonaro partially closed the border with Venezuela because of the COVID-19 pandemic to slow the spread, as the epidemic has advanced in Brazil with 291 confirmed cases and the first death reported on Tuesday. Health Minister Luiz Henrique Mandetta had urged closure of the border due to Venezuela's collapsing health system.

On March 17, 2020, the Venezuelan government implemented a nationwide quarantine after detecting 16 new cases of the novel coronavirus, President Nicolas Maduro said, adding that the total number of cases in the South American country has risen to 33, had begun a quarantine in a handful of states.

References

 
Borders of Brazil
International borders
Borders of Venezuela